Jaurim ( meaning "Purple Rainforest") is a rock band from Seoul, South Korea. They had performed in the indie scene in 1993. The band's initial name was Full Count. They changed the band's name to Jaurim in 1997 and became major with their first released single 'Hey Hey Hey' (an original soundtrack of 꽃을 든 남자, A Man who is holding Flowers). They have released ten full-length albums, three unofficial albums, two original soundtrack singles, one original soundtrack EP (which was released as a digital single), and one concert album. Their ninth full-length album, 'Goodbye, Grief' (part of their "25 Waiting for 21 Project"), was released on October 14, 2013.  The band is praised for their arrangements, and their singer, Kim Yoon-ah, is often praised for her singing abilities and lyrics.

Their drummer, Goo Tae-hoon, has run a major live club in Korea, 'Soundholic', since 2003; as well as the record label of the same name. In 2017, their twentieth year, Goo Tae-hoon announced his departure from the band, though whether it is an ultimate withdrawal or temporary hiatus is unknown.

Members
 Kim Yoon-ah (김윤아) – vocal, guitar, keyboard, songwriter
 Kim, Jin-man (김진만) – bass, guitar
 Lee, Sun-kyu (이선규) – guitar, vocals

Former members
 Goo, Tae-hoon (구태훈) – drums, percussion

Discography

Studio albums

Compilation and live albums

Extended plays

Singles

Awards and nominations

State honors

Notes

References

External links

 Jaurim official homepage

South Korean pop rock music groups
South Korean indie rock groups
Musical groups established in 1997
MAMA Award winners
Korean Music Award winners